Piper abajoense is a species of plant in the genus Piper. It was discovered by Allan Jay Bornstein in 2014. The species can only be found in Puerto Rico. In the Municipality of Utuado, Piper abajoense has an elevation of 315 meters.

References

abajoense
Flora of Puerto Rico
Plants described in 2014
Flora without expected TNC conservation status